The 19th Central American Championships in Athletics were held at the Estadio Olímpico Metropolitano in San Pedro Sula, Honduras, between June 27–28, 2008. 

A total of 43 events were contested, 22 by men and 21 by women.  There were no
athletes from Belize.

Medal summary

Complete results and medal winners were published.  A total of 5 championships records were set.

Men

Women

Notes
†: No athlete cleared the initial height.

Medal table (unofficial)

Team Rankings
Guatemala won the overall team ranking and the team ranking in the men's category. El Salvador won the team ranking in the women's category.

Total

Male

Female

References

 
Central American Championships in Athletics
Central American Championships in Athletics
Central American Championships in Athletics
Sport in San Pedro Sula
International athletics competitions hosted by Honduras